Veerasolapuram  is an ancient village located near Kallakurichi in Kallakurichi district, Tamil Nadu, India.

Climate
The temperature is moderate; the maximum and minimum temperatures being 38 °C and 21 °C respectively. The town gets its rainfall from the northeast monsoon in winter and the southwest monsoon in summer. The average annual rainfall is 1070 mm.

Agriculture
Veerasolapuram is an agricultural village.
Major crops cultivated are sugarcane and rice. The river Manimuktha runs through the village providing enough water throughout the year for irrigation.

Historical Temples

References

Villages in Kallakurichi district